Patrice Goodman is a Canadian actress. She is most noted for her starring role in the comedy television series Sunnyside, for which she and the other core cast collectively won the Canadian Screen Award for Best Performance in a Variety or Sketch Comedy Program or Series at the 4th Canadian Screen Awards in 2016.

Career 
Goodman had supporting or guest roles in the television series Platinum, This Is Wonderland, The Handmaid's Tale, The Umbrella Academy and Slasher, and the films Blues Brothers 2000, The Last Debate, Subconscious Password and Fire Serpent. In 2021 she was cast in a lead role in the family sitcom Overlord and the Underwoods.

Filmography

Film

Television

References

External links

21st-century Canadian actresses
Canadian television actresses
Canadian film actresses
Black Canadian actresses
Canadian Screen Award winners
Living people
Year of birth missing (living people)